Charles Fort (born 1951 New Britain, Connecticut) is an American poet.

Life
Fort graduated from Bowling Green State University with an MFA in 1977.
He taught at the University of Nebraska at Kearney as The Distinguished Paul W. Reynolds and Clarice Kingston Reynolds Endowed Chair in Poetry (1997–2007), and Xavier University of Louisiana.

His work has appeared in Callaloo, The Georgia Review, Connecticut Writer's Anthology, Road Apple Review, White lade, and Argo.

Awards
 1994 winner of the Open Voice Award by The Writer's Voice
 MacDowell Fellowship
 Poetry Society of America award
 1985 Randall Jarrell Poetry Prize
 The Mary Carolyn Davis Memorial Award

Works
"American Gargoyle", Oyster Boy Review 13
"The Magic Man Held a Blue Crystal Ball", Oyster Boy Review 13
Afro Psalms, University of Nebraska at Kearney Press

 We Did Not Fear The Father: New and Selected Poems (Red Hen Press, 2021)
 Mrs Belladonna's Supper Club Waltz (Backwaters Press)

Anthologies

References

External links
"Darvil Meets Little Black Sambo in Nebraska—A Poetry Performance", People of Color in Predominantly White Institutions (1998)

1951 births
Writers from New Britain, Connecticut
American male poets
Bowling Green State University alumni
MacDowell Colony fellows
Living people